A list of more than 100 different single cell sequencing (omics) methods have been published. The large majority of methods are paired with short-read sequencing technologies, although some of them are compatible with long read sequencing.

List

References 

DNA sequencing